Zeng Xianzhi (23 January 1910 – 11 October 1989) was a Chinese revolutionary and politician.

In the late 1920s and early 1930s, girls in schools was a new thing, but Zeng was a member of the girls' basketball team in school. She became a "student soldier" in a branch campus of Whampoa Military Academy. Zeng was one of the first female soldiers in China during the Revolution. After the establishment of the Communist State, she spent over 40 years working in the All-China Women's Federation. She devoted all her life to the Chinese women's rights movement.

Biography

Early life and education

Zeng was born on January 23, 1910, at Baishutang in Changsha, Hunan, with her ancestral home in Xiangxiang (now Shuangfeng County). She was a descendant of Zeng Guoquan, a renowned general in the late Qing Empire and one of three brothers of Zeng Guofan. She had five siblings. Her siblings were, in order of birth: Zeng Xianpu (1908-1966), Zeng Xiankai (1908-1985), Zeng Xianzhen (1911-1997), Zeng Xianzhu (1919-1986), and Zeng Xianju. In 1916 she attended Changsha Gudaotian Normal School. Under the influence of Xu Teli, she threw herself into China's revolution. In 1926, she was accepted to the Wuhan Central Military and Political Academy. Whilst still nominally at school she participated in the Northern Expedition.

Revolutionary career
In 1927, Zeng went to Guangzhou to help organize the Guangzhou Uprising. She joined the Communist Party of China in 1928. She was a member of the Communist underground party in Shanghai under "legal" cover as a student of South China University. In May 1929 she was arrested by the Nationalist government for participating in anti-government protests. After her release she pursued advanced studies in Japan.

Zeng returned to China in 1931. In 1937 she worked in Xinhua Daily in Wuhan, capital of Hubei province. Two years later, she was transferred to Guilin as traffic coordinator of the Eighth Route Army. In 1941 she entered the Yan'an Marxism–Leninism College and the Central Party School of the Communist Party of China; after graduation, she worked in the Dihou Gongzuo Department of the CPC Central Committee. In the spring of 1946, she attended the Chongqing Negotiations with the Communist delegation. She successively served as secretary of Deng Yingchao and group leader of the Southern Bureau Women's Group. In March 1947, she transferred to the Shanxi-Chahaer-Hebei Border Region and attended the Land Reform Movement.

After the founding of the Communist State

At the beginning of 1949, Zeng was appointed deputy secretary-general of the First National Women's Congress. This was China's first national congress for women and 500 delegates heard Mao Zedong tell them to increase production and to demand their rights.

After the congress Zeng worked in the All-China Women's Federation until the Cultural Revolution. During the Cultural Revolution, she was called a "big black umbrella" and "alien-class element" by the Communist government, and she was sent to the May Seventh Cadre Schools in Hengshui County, Hebei to be re-educated and to do farm work. In 1974, after seeing his mother's unfair treatment, Ye Xuanning wrote a letter to Mao Zedong who approved Zeng's return to Beijing.

In September 1978, Zeng was elected vice-president of the All-China Women's Federation at the Fourth National Women's Congress. She was a delegate to the 1st National People's Congress, a member of the 3rd and 6th National Committee of the Chinese People's Political Consultative Conference, and a Standing Committee member of the 4th and 5th National Committee of the Chinese People's Political Consultative Conference.

On October 11, 1989, she died of illness in Macau.

Personal life

In 1928, Zeng married Ye Jianying, who later became one of the founding Ten Marshals of the People's Republic of China. They had a son, Ye Xuanning (1938-2016).

References

External links
 
 

1910 births
1989 deaths
Politicians from Loudi
Whampoa Military Academy alumni
Chinese women in politics
Central Party School of the Chinese Communist Party alumni
People's Republic of China politicians from Hunan
Chinese Communist Party politicians from Hunan
All-China Women's Federation people